Eduard Schwyzer (15 February 1874, Zürich – 3 May 1943, Berlin) was a Swiss Classical philologist and Indo-European linguist, specializing in Ancient Greek and Greek dialects.

He was a professor in Zürich 1912–1926, in Bonn from 1927 and in Berlin from 1932. 1898–1927 and 1934–1943 he also worked for the Schweizerisches Idiotikon, first as an editor, later reading all correction sheets.

Works 
 Grammatik der Pergamenischen Inschriften 1898
 Dialectorum graecarum exempla epigraphica potiora 1923
 Griechische Grammatik I 1939, II 1950
 Kleine Schriften, 1983, ed. R. Schmitt

References

External links
Bibliography

Linguists from Switzerland
Linguists of Indo-European languages
Classical philologists
1874 births
1943 deaths